Karl Diller (born 27 January 1941) is a German politician. Born in Kaiserslautern, Rhineland-Palatinate, he represents the SPD. Karl Diller has served as a member of the Bundestag from the state of Rhineland-Palatinate from 1987 until 2009.

Life 
From 1979 to 1987 he was a member of the state parliament of Rhineland-Palatinate. From 1998 to 2009 he was Parliamentary State Secretary to the Federal Minister of Finance.

References

External links 

1941 births
Living people
Members of the Bundestag for Rhineland-Palatinate
Members of the Bundestag 2005–2009
Members of the Bundestag 2002–2005
Members of the Bundestag 1998–2002
Members of the Bundestag 1994–1998
Members of the Bundestag 1990–1994
Members of the Bundestag 1987–1990
Members of the Bundestag for the Social Democratic Party of Germany